Leucopogon sprengelioides is an erect shrub in the family Ericaceae found in Western Australia, where it grows on granite outcrops and hill, ridges and breakaways and on coastal limestone. It grows to a height of 0.2 - 0.8 m and its white flowers may be seen from March to April or July to November.

It was first described in 1845 by Otto Wilhelm Sonder. The specific epithet, sprengelioides, derives from the name, Sprengelia, and the Greek, -oides, meaning "like", indicating that the plant is like a Sprengelia.

References

External links
Leucopogon sprengelioides: Occurrence data map from Australasian Virtual Herbarium
Leucopogon sprengelioides (Flickr search)

sprengelioides
Ericales of Australia
Flora of Western Australia
Plants described in 1845
Taxa named by Otto Wilhelm Sonder